Fight Night (also known as Rigged) is a feature-length action/adventure film directed by Jonathan M. Dillon. It was produced in the United States in 2008. It was shot mostly in the state of Kansas. It was released in the US in 2009.

Plot
Michael Dublin (Chad Ortis) is a shyster specialised in illegal betting. One night during an illegal car race he gets beaten up by a participant whose car he's previously sabotaged. When his opponents are about to stash him away, a feisty female neighbor steps in. Katherine Parker (Rebecca Neuenswander) saves him and Dublin is impressed by how artfully she decks her much heavier, more muscular opponent. The next morning, Dublin finds Parker and asks her to hire him as promoter. She refuses him at first, but after she ends up in prison for attending an illegal boxing event and Dublin manages to get her out, he persuades her to go on a tour with him. Picking up fights all over the country, Parker gains notoriety as a skilled fighter, and aims to participate as a challenger in a notorious annual underground boxing event in Miami.

Selected cast
Rebecca Neuenswander as Katherine Parker
Chad Ortis as Michael Dublin
Kurt Hanover as Clark Richter 
John Wilson as Cleveland

Critical reception 
The film received mixed reviews. It has been characterised as a "fast-talking, hard-hitting romp"  Robert Koehler of Variety called it similarly "a lean and mean saga" but objected to the intentional crowdpleasing happy end. Christopher Armstead from Film Critics United criticised a certain lack of reality in regards to Katherine Parker shown as being able to knock out much heavier men, yet he admitted watching Neuenswander's performance he eventually "did buy into the fantasy of it all".

Awards
 Dances with Films (Los Angeles, CA): Grand Jury Prize (best film in festival) 
 RADAR Film Festival (Hamburg, Germany): won Best Feature Film 
 Action on Film International Film Festival (California, USA): won Best Cinematography; nominated for Best Feature, Best Action Sequence on Film 
 SoCal Film Festival (California, USA): won Best Female Performance; nominated for Best Direction

References

External links
 
 

2008 action thriller films
American crime thriller films
American LGBT-related films
Films about women's sports
2000s sports films
American boxing films
2000s English-language films
2000s American films